Borys Protsenko (born August 21, 1978) is a Ukrainian former professional ice hockey player and a Russian amateur scout for the NHL's Dallas Stars.

Career
Protsenko was drafted 1st overall by the Calgary Hitmen in the 1995 CHL Import Draft. A year later, he was drafted in the third round of the 1996 NHL Entry Draft by the Pittsburgh Penguins, selected 77th overall. Although Protsenko never played for the Pittsburgh Penguins, he did spend two years with the Penguins' AHL affiliate in Syracuse and Wilkes-Barre and an additional year with the Penguins' ECHL affiliate in Wheeling.

Protsenko spent the next two seasons splitting time in Russia and with the Ukraine National Team. He started the 2003-04 season with Sokil Kyiv, but later returned to the United States and joined the Fresno Falcons. Protsenko was recalled by the Houston Aeros on January 16, 2004 but was returned to the Falcons less than a week later. Protsenko finished the season with the South Carolina Stingrays.

Protsenko played the next three seasons in Belarus, Russia, and the Ukraine and retired after the completion of the 2006-07 season. Since his retirement, Protsenko has been the Russian amateur scout for the Dallas Stars.

Career statistics

References

External links
 

1978 births
Living people
Amur Khabarovsk players
Calgary Hitmen players
Dallas Stars scouts
Fresno Falcons players
HC Dinamo Minsk players
Houston Aeros (1994–2013) players
Pittsburgh Penguins draft picks
Sokil Kyiv players
South Carolina Stingrays players
Sportspeople from Kyiv
Syracuse Crunch players
Ukrainian ice hockey right wingers
Wheeling Nailers players
Wilkes-Barre/Scranton Penguins players
Ukrainian expatriate sportspeople in Canada
Ukrainian expatriate sportspeople in the United States
Expatriate ice hockey players in Canada
Expatriate ice hockey players in the United States
Ukrainian expatriate ice hockey people
Expatriate ice hockey players in Russia
Expatriate ice hockey players in Belarus
Ukrainian expatriate sportspeople in Russia
Ukrainian expatriate sportspeople in Belarus